Kirsty Lee Akers is an Australian country singer-songwriter.

Career
Akers performed in public for the first time at the age of three years and recorded her first EP in 2006, at the age of 16. She funded that recording with the money she made busking on the streets of Tamworth, New South Wales. Akers graduated from the CMAA Academy of Country Music.

In 2007, at the age of 18, Akers won the Star Maker Award at the Tamworth Country Music Festival and signed her first record deal and released her debut studio album, Little Things the same year. Akers reflected saying, "I used to write my own songs but I had maybe one original song on my first album which was really strange for me at the time because I only ever sang my own songs, but the label [Compass Bros.] at the time wanted me to record different songs, and when I look back now I wish I had that support to record my own music."

In 2010, Akers cut ties with Compass Bros. and released music independently. Her third album Naked was released in April 2011 and was nominated for 3 Golden Guitar Awards - Best Female Artist, Best Music Video, and Best Vocal Collaboration.

In early 2015, Akers signed a new deal with Maven/Sony Music Australia and in April 2016, released Burn Baby Burn.

In July 2018, Akers released Under My Skin which peaked at number 29 on the ARIA Charts.

In 2021, Akers competed on the seventeenth season of television series The Block with her husband Jesse Anderson.

In April 2022, Akers released her sixth studio album, and first on her own label, Rider Records, which she launched in 2021 with husband Jesse Anderson and manager Perrin Finlay-Brown. The album debuted at number 11 on the ARIA Charts.

Discography

Awards and nominations

AIR Awards
The Australian Independent Record Awards (commonly known informally as AIR Awards) is an annual awards night to recognise, promote and celebrate the success of Australia's Independent Music sector.

! 
|-
| AIR Awards of 2009
|Better Days
| Best Independent Country Album
| 
| 
|-

APRA Awards
The APRA Awards are held in Australia and New Zealand by the Australasian Performing Right Association to recognise songwriting skills, sales and airplay performance by its members annually.

! 
|-
| 2017
| "Burn Baby Burn" (Kirsty Lee Akers, Trey Bruce)
| Country Work of the Year
| 
| 
|-

CMA Awards
The Country Music Awards of Australia is an annual awards night held in January during the Tamworth Country Music Festival, celebrating recording excellence in the Australian country music industry.
 (wins only)
|-
| 2007 || Kirsty Lee Akers || Star Maker Award ||  || 
|-
| 2008 || "Little Things" by Kirsty Lee Akers || Maton New Talent of the Year || 
|-
| 2021 || "True Blue" (with Amber Lawrence, Aleyce Simmonds and Dianna Corcoran || Vocal Collaboration of the Year || 
|-

References

External links
 offiical web site

Living people
Australian women singer-songwriters
Participants in Australian reality television series
Australian country singers
Australian women singers
21st-century Australian singers
21st-century Australian women singers
Year of birth missing (living people)